Commodore Frederick Dean  (1900–1983) was a South African military commander.

Military career 

During World War I, he served with the Mercantile Marine, attached to the Royal Navy. He became a sub-lieutenant in the RNR and served in submarines.

From 1942, he was Commanding Officer, Cape Town Detachment, Seaward Defence Force.

In 1945, he became Commander Seaward Defences, South African Naval Forces, effectively the head of the South African Navy.

Later career

He was a trustee of the National War Museum from 1946 to 1952.

Awards and decorations

See also

 List of South African military chiefs
 South African Navy

References

1900 births
1983 deaths
South African Navy personnel
South African Officers of the Order of the British Empire
British Merchant Service personnel of World War I
South African military personnel of World War II